Tarnowo Podgórne  is an urbanized village in Poznań County, Greater Poland Voivodeship, in west-central Poland. It is the seat of the gmina (administrative district) called Gmina Tarnowo Podgórne.

The village has a population of 3,804.

Tarnowo Podgórne was the host of the 2021 World Team Ninepin Bowling Classic Championships.

References

Villages in Poznań County